Maliarpha brunnella is a species of snout moth in the genus Maliarpha. It was described by Cook in 1997, and is known from Sudan (including Mongalla, the type location).

References

Moths described in 1997
Anerastiini